Protognathodus is an extinct conodont genus in the family Idiognathodontidae.

References 

 The stratigraphical significance of the Protognathodus fauna from Stockum (Devonian/Carboniferous boundary, Rhenish Schiefergebirge). Alberti H, Groos-Uffenorde H, Streel M, Uffenorde H and Walliser OH, Newsletters on Stratigraphy, 1 Oct. 1974, Volume 3, Number 4, pages 263-276

External links 

 

Ozarkodinida genera
Carboniferous conodonts
Devonian conodonts
Fossil taxa described in 1969